Sixteen nations qualified for the 2011 World Netball Championships, to be held in Singapore from 3–10 July. Participating nations have sent representative netball teams each comprising 12 players. Player rosters for all 16 teams were submitted to tournament organisers, and published on the WNC2011 website two days before the start of the tournament. Teams were divided into four groups for the initial pool stage.

Pool A









Pool B









Pool C









Pool D









References

 
World